Denervation is any loss of nerve supply regardless of the cause. If the nerves lost to denervation are part of the neuronal communication to a specific function in the body then altered or a loss of physiological functioning can occur. Denervation can be caused by injury or be a symptom of a disorder like ALS, post-polio syndrome, or POTS. Additionally, it can be a useful surgical technique to alleviate major negative symptoms, such as in renal denervation. Denervation can have many harmful side effects such as increased risk of infection and tissue dysfunction.

Causes 
The loss of nerve supply can be caused by injury, disorders, or result from a surgical procedure.

Injuries 
Denervation may be the result of nerve injury. The three main types of nerve injury are neurapraxia, axonotmesis and neurotmesis. These three types distinguish between the severity of the nerve damage and the potential for recovery after the damage. After an injury in which some nerves are damaged, the brain has shown capabilities in rewiring or rearranging neuronal circuitry. This plasticity allows for the brain to compensate for the loss in neuronal communication resulting from injury.

Disorders 
Denervation processes have a strong association with the symptoms seen in post-polio syndrome. Those with post polio syndrome are undergoing a constant process of denervation and reinnervation. This process occurs after acute poliomyelitis and leads to increased motor unit areas over time. The motor unit areas soon increase to a point where reinnervation is no longer possible causing an uncompensated denervation of motor units which leads to muscle atrophy and loss of muscular strength. Following an acute polio infection diagnosis symptoms such as fatiguability, general weakness and pain are believed to be correlated to muscle denervation.

Much like post-polio syndrome, amyotrophic lateral sclerosis also has similar symptoms of motor neuron degeneration leading to general weakness and in some cases paralysis. The type of symptoms experienced can depend on which particular areas of the body experience the loss in nerve supply. This process of denervation is however different from post-polio syndrome in that it only involves upper and lower motor neuron degeneration and does not experience a process of constant reinnervation and denervation.

Surgical procedures 
In addition to peripheral nerve injury, denervation is used as a medical procedure for various benefits resulting from eliminating nerve supply to a specific area of the body. In renal denervation, the procedure involves using radio frequency or ultrasound to remove sympathetic nerve supply to the wall of the kidney with the intention of reducing blood pressure and treating chronic hypertension. However, renal denervation is used less frequently in recent years due to new evidence suggesting that blood pressure is not significantly reduced after the procedure and there are even recommendations against using the procedure since there has been little proof to show that renal denervation leads to reduced blood pressure.

Other prevalent surgical procedures involve intentionally reducing nerve supply to treat a variety of disorders. In a sympathectomy, a sympathetic ganglion is surgically removed to treat hyperhidrosis, or excessive sweating. In a vagotomy, the vagus nerve is surgically removed to treat peptic ulcer disease through reducing stomach acid. In a rhizotomy, nerve fibers in the spinal cord are removed in the hopes of eliminating chronic muscle pain.

Physiological differences 
In regard to skeletal muscle denervation there are two distinct diagnoses: entrapment and compressive neuropathies or non-entrapment neuropathies. Entrapment and compressive neuropathy syndromes occur due to compression and/or constriction on a specific location for a segment of a single nerve or multiple nerve sites. This entrapment or compression can be diagnosed based on multiple factors including physical examination, electrodiagnostic test and clinical history.

Following denervation, muscular atrophy and degeneration occurs within affected skeletal muscle tissue. Within the skeletal tissue is observable progressive loss of weight of denervated muscles as well as reduction in muscle fiber size and quantity. These muscles exhibit a slowing of contraction speed, a reduction of developed tension, and twitch force.

Magnetic resonance imaging (MRI) and high-resolution ultrasonography (US) are two clinical imaging examinations performed to classify the different diagnoses. Ultrasonography is advantageous with the evaluation of peripheral nerve resolutions while Magnetic Resonance Imaging is more sensitive in regard to signal intensity changes of the muscle.

Denervation affects the muscle activation process that is brought on by the development and propagation of an action potential and the ensuing release of calcium. It is found that there is an increase with calcium reuptake because of changes within sarcoplasmic reticulum morphology and structure. As a result, there is a decrease in amplitude and velocity of impulse conduction with an increase in muscle spike duration.

In clinical and experimental studies there is an observed increase in muscle excitability in electrical currents involving chemical actions, while there is a decrease in excitability to current associated with electrical induction in denervated muscles. Changes in the resting membrane potential involving denervated muscles presents mild depolarization when a muscle contraction stimulus is present. While there is no immediate change involving resting and action potential, there is an increase with membrane resistance. After prolonged denervation, it is revealed that resting membrane potential over time is reduced while action potentials progressively decreased and become slower. Acetylcholine is a neurotransmitter that becomes supersensitive in the presence of denervated muscle. Upon injection of acetylcholine, a slower contractile response, which is drastically under action potential threshold, is elicited.

Reinnervation possibilities 
Denervated muscles have shown the ability to survive after periods of denervation or in the case of a damaged nerve. The size of the nerve and its ability to function can be maintained if it is electrically stimulated soon after denervation, in clinical experiments. home-based functional electrical stimulation has been shown to rescue muscles which have experienced severe atrophy as a result of denervation. This process involves electrically stimulating the nerves innervating the affected  part of the body, using  electrodes placed on the skin.

For muscles that cannot be rescued via home-based functional electrical stimulation, an Italian study suggests that, at some point in the future, the following techniques may be applicable: they must first have induction and separation of autologous myogenic cells. This can be completed either by in vivo marcaine infiltration of muscle tissue that can then be grown in vitro, or have in vitro induction of autologous adipose tissue followed by selection of myogenic stem cells that can be recreated in vivo. The new autologous myogenic stem cells will be injected, proliferated and differentiated into new mature muscle fibers. Functional properties of these newly created muscle fibers will be induced via surface electrodes and an external neuromodulator.

References 

Peripheral nervous system disorders